Spirit is the third album by Finnish glam metal band Reckless Love, released on 2 September 2013 through Spinefarm Records / Universal Music. The album peaked at No. 3 on Finland Albums Top 50 music chart.

Track listing

Reception

The album received mixed reception from critics, who praised it for trying to bring the glam metal genre back to popularity, but criticized it for its poppish approach.

Chart performance

Personnel
Reckless Love
Olli Herman – lead vocals
Pepe Reckless – lead guitar
Hessu Maxx – drums
Jalle Verne – bass guitar

Production
Produced by Ikka Wirtanen
Mastered by Pauli Saastamoinen at Finnvox, Finland, 2013

References

2013 albums
Reckless Love albums
Spinefarm Records albums